Roxanne M. Roberts (born 1954 in Minneapolis, Minnesota) is a style writer for The Washington Post. She was co-author of "The Reliable Source" column with Amy Argetsinger, the paper's daily chronicle of Washington D.C.'s notables and society events. She is a regular panelist on the NPR quiz show Wait Wait... Don't Tell Me!.

In 2000, Roberts appeared on the "In" list in Washingtonian magazine.

In 2009, Roberts received some media attention for her role in the gatecrashing incident at the first state dinner under the presidency of Barack Obama. She informed two White House staffers that the Salahis were not on the official guest list, and was apparently the only person who caught the mishap that night. However, her suspicions were not acted on, which furthered the image that the White House staff at the event had handled the situation incompetently.

Personal
Roberts' son is Carter Lockwood, who appeared as a contestant on Jeopardy! starting on February 18, 2022.  In 1996 she wrote a piece for the Post about her father, who committed suicide when he was 46 and she was 21.

References

External links
C-SPAN (website), Roxanne Roberts, C-SPAN appearances

Living people
American public radio personalities
Writers from Minneapolis
1954 births
The Washington Post journalists
20th-century American journalists
21st-century American journalists
American women journalists
Journalists from Minnesota
20th-century American women
21st-century American women